Beth Israel Synagogue is a historic former Jewish synagogue building at 238 Columbia Street in Cambridge, Massachusetts.  Built in 1901, it was the first and principal synagogue to serve the East Cambridge area, and is a fine local example of Romanesque architecture.  Now converted into residential condominiums, it was listed on the National Register of Historic Places in 1982.

Description and history
The former Beth Israel Synagogue stands in The Port neighborhood of eastern Cambridge, on the east side of Columbia Street, between Hampshire and Market Streets.  It is a two-story brick building with a gabled roof and flanking square towers.  Its Romanesque styling includes bands of narrow round-arch windows and a large Syrian arch sheltering the main entrance.  Brick corbelling adorns the eaves of the pyramidal tower roofs, and is featured in multiple bands at the base of the front gable.  The building was designed by Nathan Douglass and completed in 1903.

The known history of Jewish worship in East Cambridge begins in 1898, with the founding of Congregation Anshai Sfard.  It originally met in private residences.  Congregation Beth Israel was founded in 1900, and construction was begun on this building in 1901.  In 1906 the congregation divided over doctrinal differences, resulting in the founding of Congregation Agudath Ashkenazim.  Congregation Anshai Sfard merged with Beth Israel in 1957. In 1962 Beth Israel and Agudath Ashkenazim merged to form Temple Beth Shalom of Cambridge, and the new congregation chose to use the Temple Ashkenaz building on Tremont Street in Cambridge.  By 1982, the Beth Israel building, no longer used as a synagogue, was taken over by the Cambridge Redevelopment Authority, and was added to the National Register of Historic Places. The former synagogue building currently houses condominium units.

See also
National Register of Historic Places listings in Cambridge, Massachusetts

References

Former synagogues in Massachusetts
Synagogues on the National Register of Historic Places in Massachusetts
Romanesque Revival synagogues
Buildings and structures in Cambridge, Massachusetts
National Register of Historic Places in Cambridge, Massachusetts
Synagogues completed in 1901